Flamsteed is a small lunar impact crater located on the Oceanus Procellarum, which is named after British astronomer John Flamsteed. It lies almost due east of the dark-hued Grimaldi, and north-northwest of the flooded Letronne bay on the south edge of the mare.

The rim of this crater is not circular in form, having a bulging rim to the southeast. The interior is relatively flat and undistinguished by impacts. The crater lies within the southern rim of a crater that has been almost completely submerged by the basaltic lava flows that formed the Oceanus Procellarum. All that remains of this feature designated Flamsteed P are some low ridges and hills arranged in a circular formation.

The Surveyor 1 craft landed within the northeast rim of the buried Flamsteed P feature, about 50 kilometers north-northeast of the Flamsteed crater rim.

Satellite craters
By convention these features are identified on lunar maps by placing the letter on the side of the crater midpoint that is closest to Flamsteed.

References

External links
 Lunar Orbiter 1 photo 192, showing the northeastern part of Flamsteed P, where Surveyor 1 landed

Impact craters on the Moon